Indian River is an unincorporated community and census-designated place (CDP) in Cheboygan County in the U.S. state of Michigan.  The population was 1,950 at the 2020 census.  The CDP is located in Tuscarora Township between Burt Lake and Mullett Lake.

As an unincorporated community, Indian River has no legal autonomy of its own but does have its own post office with the 49749 ZIP Code, which also serves small portions of several surrounding townships.

History
The area of Indian River was first settled as early as 1876.  The community was founded two years later by land owner Floyd Martin and surveyed and platted by Oliver Hayden by 1880.  The new settlement was named after the Indian River, which flows through the community.  A post office was established on September 22, 1879.

The North Central State Trail goes through the town. The National Shrine of the Cross in the Woods, an open-air sanctuary, is located in Indian River and dedicated to Kateri Tekakwitha, the first Native American saint.

Geography

Indian River is situated along the course of the Indian River, which connects Burt Lake and Mullett Lake. The Sturgeon River also drains into Burt Lake within the community.  Burt Lake State Park is located within the community on the southeastern shores of Burt Lake.

Major highways
 runs south–north through the center of the community.
 runs through the southern portion of the community.
 has its southern terminus at I-75 within Indian River.

Demographics

As of the census of 2000, there were 2,008 people, 929 households, and 614 families residing in the CDP. The racial makeup of the CDP was 97.16% White, 0.05% Black or African American, 0.90% Native American, 0.10% Asian, 0.20% from other races, and 1.59% from two or more races. Hispanic or Latino of any race were 1.44% of the population.

There were 929 households, out of which 23.0% had children under the age of 18 living with them, 56.6% were married couples living together, 7.4% had a female householder with no husband present, and 33.9% were non-families. 29.9% of all households were made up of individuals, and 14.3% had someone living alone who was 65 years of age or older.  The average household size was 2.16 and the average family size was 2.65.

In the CDP, the population was spread out, with 19.0% under the age of 18, 4.9% from 18 to 24, 22.5% from 25 to 44, 29.5% from 45 to 64, and 24.1% who were 65 years of age or older.  The median age was 47 years. For every 100 females, there were 93.8 males.  For every 100 females age 18 and over, there were 90.6 males.

The median income for a household in the CDP was $34,854, and the median income for a family was $41,667. Males had a median income of $40,139 versus $21,042 for females. The per capita income for the CDP was $20,191.  About 5.5% of families and 7.1% of the population were below the poverty line, including 8.7% of those under age 18 and 5.3% of those age 65 or over.

References

External links
 Indian River Tourist Bureau
 Indian River Chamber of Commerce
 Indian River site, provided by the Straitsland Resorter
 Straitsland Resorter, Indian River newspaper

Unincorporated communities in Cheboygan County, Michigan
Census-designated places in Michigan
Unincorporated communities in Michigan
Census-designated places in Cheboygan County, Michigan
Populated places established in 1876
1876 establishments in Michigan